East Cape Lighthouse is a lighthouse sited on Otiki Hill above East Cape, the easternmost point on the North Island of New Zealand. It is owned and operated by Maritime New Zealand. The lighthouse was originally constructed on nearby East Island. However the island was difficult to access (four men died during tower construction when their boat capsized) and proved to be susceptible to earthquakes and subsequent landslips. In 1920 a decision was made to relocate the light to the mainland and in April 1922, the light was extinguished and then relit at its current location in December of that year. Originally manned by three lighthouse keepers, the light's staffing was progressively reduced until it was fully automated in 1985. It is now controlled from the Maritime New Zealand headquarters in Wellington. While the area around the light is accessible by foot, the lighthouse itself is not open to the public.

See also 

 List of lighthouses in New Zealand

References

External links 

 
 Lighthouses of New Zealand Maritime New Zealand

Lighthouses completed in 1900
Lighthouses in New Zealand
Transport buildings and structures in the Gisborne District
1900s architecture in New Zealand